Baotai (保泰; 13 May 1682 – 29 September 1730), formally known as  Prince Yu of the First Rank (裕親王),  was a Manchu prince of the Qing Dynasty. He was the son of Fuquan and the grandson of Emperor Shunzi.

Family 
Parents

 Father: Fuquan, Prince Yuxian of the First Rank裕憲親王 福全; 8 September 1653 – 10 August 1703), second son of Emperor Shunzi
 Mother: Secondary consort, of the Gūwalgiya clan (側福晉 瓜爾佳氏)

Consorts and their respectives issue(s):

 Primary Consort, of the Menggiya clan (嫡妻孟佳氏)
 Guangshan (广善, 20 August 1697 – 22 October 1745), Heir Son (世子), first son
 Guang' en (广恩, 27 October 1699 – 24 June 1739), second son
 Guanghua (广华, 16 October 1704 – 1741, Duke of the Second Rank (奉恩輔國公),  third son
 Second Primary Consort, of the  Gūwalgiya clan (繼妻瓜爾佳氏)
 Guangyu (广裕, 14 June 1708 – 1735), fifth son
 Guanghui (广惠, 4 June 1709 – 1712), seventh son
 Guangguo (广果, 1710 – 28 February 1712), eight son
 Guangnian (广年, 20 December 1713 – 1774), twelfth son
 Third Primary Consort, of the Šumuru clan (三娶妻舒穆祿氏)
 Mistress, of the Wu clan (妾吳氏)
 Mistress, of the Šumuru clan (妾舒穆祿氏)
 Guangxiu (广秀, 27 March 1710 –  1712), tenth son
 Guangqing (广卿, 1713 – 15 Mai 1714), eleventh son
 Guangyuan (广缘, 14 September 1714 – 1720), thirteenth son
 Guangchen (广臣, 17 October 1718– 1719), fifteenth son
 Guangsheng (广升, 1720 – 26 May 1741), sixteenth son
 Guanghan (广汉, 11 April 1723 – 26 March 1725), eighteenth son
 Mistress, of the Liu clan (妾劉氏)
 Guangying (广英, 1720 – 1767, Third Class Imperial Guard (三等侍卫), seventeenth son
 Mistress, of the Tian clan (妾田氏)
 Guanggui (广贵,  15  May 1705 – 29 July 1750), Third Class Imperial Guard (三等侍卫), fourth son
 Guangyi (广义,  16 February 1709 – 1711), sixth son
 Mistress, of the Gūwalgiya clan  (妾瓜爾佳氏)
 Guangqing (广清,  1710 – 13 February 1711), ninth son
 Mistress, of the Zhu clan (妾朱氏)
 Mistress, of the Xiang clan (妾項氏)
 Guangyun (广云, 17 October 1715—1756), fourteenth son
 Guangkun (广坤, 14 March 1724 – 18 June 1786), Imperial Guard (侍衛), nineteenth son
 Guangxian (广先, 1725 – 1727), twentieth son
 Guangji (广吉, 14 June 1727  – 1774), twenty–second son
 Guangqiu (广求, 11 October 1728 – 1729), twenty –fourth son
 Mistress, of the Guo clan (妾郭氏)
 Guangchun (广春, 22 August 1725 –  1731), twenty–first son
 Mistress, of the Shi clan (妾施氏)
 Guangzhao (广照,  14 April 1728 – 23 Match 1729), twenty – third son
 Guangrui (广瑞, 1730 – 1736), twenty-fifth son
 Mistress, of the Jiang clan (妾姜氏)
 Mistress, of the Wang clan (妾王氏)
 Mistress, of the Li clan (妾李氏)
 Mistress, of the Tian clan (妾田氏)

References 

 Zhao Erxun.Draft History of Qing.Vol.2: Biography six
 Aisin Gioro Genealogy, p. 1190

1682 births
1730 deaths
Manchu nobility